NA-13 Battagram is a constituency for the National Assembly of Pakistan. It covers the whole of district Battagram. The constituency was formerly known as NA-22 (Battagram) from 1977 to 2018. The name changed to NA-12 (Battagram) after the delimitation in 2018 and to NA-13 (Battagram) after the delimitation in 2022.

Members of Parliament

1977–2002: NA-22 (Battagram)

2002–2018: NA-22 (Battagram)

Since 2018: NA-12 (Battagram)

Elections since 2002

2002 general election

A total of 1,422 votes were rejected.

2008 general election

A total of 1,027 votes were rejected.

2013 general election

A total of 3,400 votes were rejected.

2018 general election 

General elections were held on 25 July 2018.

†Change from combined vote of JUI-F, JI, and MDM in 2013

See also
NA-12 Kohistan-cum-Lower Kohistan-cum-Kolai Palas Kohistan
NA-14 Mansehra-I

References

External links 
Election result's official website

12
12